The Soviet locomotive class LV was a Soviet main freight steam locomotive type. Between 1952 and 1956, 522 locomotives were built.

Development 
The class LV locomotive was designed as a successor to the class L 2-10-0, which had been a successful design developed during World War II.  However, by the late 1940s some drawbacks to the design, including poor operating qualities when operating in reverse, had become apparent.  In 1949 the General Directorate of the Ministry of Railways authorized the development of a new 2-10-2 locomotive.  Voroshilovgrad Works in Voroshilovgrad, Ukrainian SSR (now Luhansk, Ukraine), began designing the new locomotive and the prototype was ready in 1951. Initially the class was designated OR18, with the prototype locomotive numbered OR18-01, but the designation was later changed to class LV.

In addition to a new boiler and firebox, advancements over the class L included a centralized lubrication system, pneumatic grates, power reverse, and roller bearings on all axles. Upon arrival at the SZD testing facility in June 1952 the prototype locomotive was closely examined and found to exceed previous types in tractive effort and horsepower.  It was also shown to be the most efficient design then in operation in Russia, with thermal efficiency of 9.27%.  Locomotive OR18-01 was placed into revenue service at Lublin Depot in August 1953.

Following the successful test of OR18-01, a second locomotive was constructed in November 1953 incorporating minor changes, with two more pre-production locomotives produced during early 1954.  Later in that year the first six production locomotives were built and the class designation was changed to LV (though the four prototypes were renumbered with LV18, rather than LV, prefixes).  The six production locomotives, LV-0005 to LV-0010, were built with plain bearings but were designed to be converted to roller bearings later.

The success of the initial batch of production locomotives resulted in Voroshilovgrad Works beginning mass production of class LV locomotives in 1955.  Locomotives 0011-0112 were produced in the first year, with another 400 locomotives numbered 0113-0522 completed in 1956.  Some changes were made during the course of the production run.  Different combinations of plain bearings and roller bearings were produced, and starting with number 0026 a six-axle tender was substituted for the four-axle tender used with earlier locomotives.  The drawbar connection between the locomotive and tender was also strengthened at the same time.

Initially it was planned to construct 3,000 locomotives of class LV, but in February 1956 at the 20th Communist Party Congress it was decided that a broad program of railway modernization would be embarked upon.  Diesel-electric and electric locomotives were to supplant steam locomotives, on which construction would cease.  With this decision the production of class LV locomotives was cut off, as was work on a more powerful 2-10-2 under development designated class OR21.  At the end of 1956, locomotive LV-0522 became the last steam locomotive completed at Voroshilovgrad Works.

The design of the LV is believed to have partly influenced the design of the QJ class locomotive built in the People's Republic of China in the late 1950s to 1980s.

Operation 

The first prototype of class LV entered service on the Moscow-Kursk-Donbas line, operating out of Lublin Depot from August 1953 to April 1954 in testing. Once the type entered production, they were no longer used on this line as they were more powerful than needed. Production locomotives entered service on the South Urals, East Siberian and Krasnoyarsk railway lines, where following their introduction train weights increased by 25-30% and coal consumption fell 12-14% on average.

In 1959, with electrification of the main line of the Trans-Siberian Railway, locomotives operating on that line out of Kartali Depot were transferred to the Tselinnoe, Northern, Kemerovo and South Urals railway lines.  As of 1976 there were still 521 locomotives of the class in operation on the Northern (168 locomotives), Kazakh (209 locomotives), Sverdlovsk (35 locomotives), South Urals (34 locomotives), and West Siberian (75 locomotives) lines.  However retirement of steam locomotives began in earnest in the late 1960s and eventually all locomotives of this type were retired.

Preserved Locomotives

In working condition 

 LV-0123 — Sverdlovsk Region, Russia: restored to working order at Tikhoretsk in 2017
 LV-0165 — Chrysostom Depot, Troitsk, Chelyabinsk oblast, Russia
 LV-0182 — Podmoskovnaya Depot, Moscow, Russia
 LV-0233 — Tikhoretsk, Krasnodar Region, Russia
 LV-0283 — Podmoskovnaya Depot, Moscow, Russia
 LV-0522 — Moscow, Podmoskovnaya Depot, Russia

Conserved 
 LV-0041 — At Tikhoretsk, Russia, for restoration to working order
 LV-0192 — Podmoskovnaya Depot, Moscow, Russia
 LV-0355 — At Tikhoretsk for restoration to working order
 LV-0415 — "Pioneer Park" the October Railway, Lebyazhe, Leningrad oblast, Russia

In museums 

 LV18-01 — Lebyazhye Railway Museum, Lebyazhye, Lomonosovsky District, Leningrad Oblast, Russia
 LV18-002 — Russian Railway Museum Saint Petersburg, Russia
 LV-0040 — Novosibirsk Railway Museum, Russia
 LV-0202 — Brest Railway Museum, Belarus
 LV-0225 — Nizhny Novgorod Railway Museum, Russia
 LV-0268 — Samara Railway Museum, Russia
 LV-0333 — Rostov Railway Museum, Yaroslavl Oblast, Russia
 LV-0407 — Donetsk Museum, Ukraine
 LV-0420 — October Railway Museum, Shushary, Russia
 LV-0428 — Chelyabinsk Railway Museum, Russia
 LV-0441 — Moscow Railway Museum, Russia
 LV-0487 — Tashkent Railway Museum, Uzbekistan

Memorial steam locomotive 
 LV-0190 — Kyzylordy, Qyzylorda, Kazakhstan
 LV-0197 — Vologda Depot, Vologda, Russia
 LV-0478 — Pechora Depot, Komi Republic, Russia

Abandoned 
 LV-0044 — Zlatoust, Russia
 LV-0092 — Embi, Kazakhstan
 LV-0096 — Shchuchinsk, Aqmola, Kazakhstan
 LV-0348 — Astana, Kazakhstan
 LV-0387 — Shchuchinsk, Aqmola, Kazakhstan

See also
 Russian Railway Museum, St. Petersburg
 The Museum of the Moscow Railway, at Paveletsky Rail Terminal, Moscow
 Rizhsky Rail Terminal, Home of the Moscow Railway Museum
 Finland Station, St. Petersburg
 History of rail transport in Russia

References

Railway locomotives introduced in 1952
LV
2-10-2 locomotives
5 ft gauge locomotives
Freight locomotives